Stephano Wooding (born 26 December 1979) is a Dutch former professional footballer who played as a left back.

Career
Wooding started playing in youth department of SV Lelystad '67. After impressing as a defender, he moved to the youth academy of SC Heerenveen. However, he did not manage to break through to the first team and was sent on loan to Finnish club KuPS for one season. The following season, he was a bench player at Heerenveen and in 2001 he signed a contract with Heracles Almelo. On 18 August 2001, he made his league debut against TOP Oss in the Eerste Divisie. After three seasons with Heracles, his professional career came to an end and he played another season as on an amateur deal with DOVO.

Honours
Heracles Almelo
 Eerste Divisie: 2004–05

References

External links
Profile at Voetbal International

1979 births
Living people
Dutch footballers
Dutch expatriate footballers
Footballers from Eindhoven
SC Heerenveen players
Kuopion Palloseura players
Heracles Almelo players
VV DOVO players
Eerste Divisie players
Expatriate footballers in Finland
Dutch expatriate sportspeople in Finland
Association football defenders